Doris Anita Dibble (January 20, 1901 – March 24, 1974) was an actress who appeared in films. She supported Al St. John in comedy roles.

Early life

Deane was born in 1901 in Wisconsin.

Marriage to Roscoe Arbuckle

She married film director Roscoe Arbuckle May 16, 1925. The marriage followed soon after his divorce from Minta Durfee and followed the rape and manslaughter accusations against him in the death of Virginia Rappe. They planned to honeymoon in New York. They later divorced and she sued for alimony in 1929.

She and Arbuckle were guests of writer Gouverneur Morris before their marriage. She was in the 1944 play The Day Will Come.

Career

Deane is included in the documentary film 4 Clowns.

Later life

Deane died in Hollywood in 1974. She is buried in Hollywood Forever Cemetery.

Filmography

The Secret Four (1921)
The Shark Master (1921)
 The Half Breed (1922)
Stupid, But Brave (1924)
The Iron Mule (1925)
Seven Chances (1925)
Marriage Rows (1931)

References

External links

 

20th-century American actresses
1901 births
1974 deaths
Actresses from Wisconsin
Actresses from Hollywood, Los Angeles
American silent film actresses
Burials at Hollywood Forever Cemetery